Bobby Battle (January 8, 1944 – December 6, 2019 in Detroit)  was an American jazz drummer. Occasionally he played saxophone.

History
Battle moved to New York City in 1968, playing with Roland Kirk and Pharoah Sanders shortly after his arrival. He studied at New York University from 1972 to 1975. He played with Don Pullen and Sam Rivers through the late 1970s, and worked often with Arthur Blythe in the 1980s and 1990s. He also worked with Kenny Dorham, Sonny Stitt, and Sonny Fortune. He worked as a duo with Jimmy Ponder in 1987.

Battle's only release as a leader is The Offering, issued in 1990 on Mapleshade, on which Battle leads a quartet with David Murray, Larry Willis, and Santi Debriano.

Discography

As leader
The Offering (Mapleshade, 1990)

As sideman
With Arthur Blythe
 Illusions (Columbia, 1980)
 Blythe Spirit (Columbia, 1981)
 Elaborations (Columbia, 1982)
 Light Blue: Arthur Blythe Plays Thelonious Monk (Columbia, 1983)
With Don Pullen
 Capricorn Rising (Black Saint, 1975)
 Tomorrow's Promises (Atlantic, 1977)
 Warriors (Black Saint, 1979)
 The Sixth Sense (Black Saint, 1985)

References
Gary W. Kennedy, "Bobby Battle". Grove Jazz online.
https://www.amoeba.com/blog/2019/12/jamoeblog/rest-in-peace-detroit-jazz-drummer-bobby-battle-1944-2019-.html

American jazz drummers
Musicians from Detroit
1944 births
Living people
20th-century American drummers
American male drummers
Jazz musicians from Michigan
20th-century American male musicians
American male jazz musicians
Mapleshade Records artists